Eremias andersoni, also known commonly as Anderson's racerunner, is a species of lizard in the family Lacertidae. The species is endemic to Iran.

Etymology
The specific name, andersoni, is in honor of American herpetologist Steven Clement Anderson (born 1936).

Geographic range
E. andersoni is found in northern Iran, in Kavir National Park.

Habitat
The preferred natural habitat of E. andersoni is desert.

Reproduction
E. andersoni is oviparous.

References

Further reading
Darevsky IS, Shcherbak NN (1978). "Eremias andersoni a New Lizard (Reptilia, Lacertilia, Lacertidae) from Iran". Journal of Herpetology 12 (1): 13–15.
Nasrabadi R, Rastegar-Pouyani N, Rastegar-Pouyani E, Gharzi A (2017). "A revised key to the lizards of Iran (Reptilia: Squamata: Lacertilia)". Zootaxa 4227 (3): 431–443.
Nilson G, Andrén C (1981). "Die Herpetofauna des Kavir-Schutzgebietes, Kavir-Wüste, Iran ". Salamandra 17 (3/4): 130–146. (Eremias andersoni, p. 138). (in German).
Sindaco R, Jeremchenko VK (2008). The Reptiles of the Western Palearctic. 1. Annotated Checklist and Distributional Atlas of the Turtles, Crocodiles, Amphisbaenians and Lizards of Europe, North Africa, Middle East and Central Asia. (Monographs of the Societas Herpetologica Italica). Latina, Italy: Edizioni Belvedere. 580 pp. .

Eremias
Reptiles described in 1978
Taxa named by Ilya Darevsky
Taxa named by Mykola Szczerbak